Milena Minkova (Bulgarian: Милена Минкова) is a Bulgarian scholar of Latin language.

She has lived, studied and taught in Switzerland, Germany and Italy. She is now a resident of the United States and teaches Latin and Classics at the University of Kentucky in Lexington. Since the last decade of the 20th century, she has been one of the leading figures in the revival of the use of Latin among Latin scholars and teachers. She earned two Ph.Ds in Classics and Latin, one from the University of Sofia (1992) and the Pontifical Salesian University in Rome (1995).

She has authored several books, including The Personal Names of the Latin Inscriptions in Bulgaria (Peter Lang, 2000); The Protean Ratio (Peter Lang, 2001); Introduction to Latin Prose Composition (Bolchazy-Carducci, 2007), as well as published a translation of John Scotus Eriugena's De divisione naturae (Sofia 1994). Minkova has also published numerous articles on Latin medieval philosophy (recently on the 12th century cosmologists Bernardus Silvestris, Alan of Lille, and Johannes de Hauvilla), Latin literature, Latin composition, and Latin pedagogy. With her colleague Terence Tunberg, Minkova has co-authored four books: Readings and Exercises in Latin Prose Composition (Focus, 2004); Reading Livy's Rome: Selections from Books I-VI Of Livy's Ab Urbe Condita (Bolchazy-Carducci, 2005); Mater Anserina: Poems in Latin for Children (Focus, 2006); Latin for the New Millennium, an introductory Latin textbook (Bolchazy-Carducci, two volumes, 2008–2009; the third volume was prepared by a different author).

She is currently working on a critical anthology of Neo-Latin texts. Minkova is an associate director of the Institute for Latin Studies at the University of Kentucky, in which students study the entire history of Latin from ancient to modern times and where classes are conducted in Latin. Together with Tunberg, Minkova conducts various seminars and workshops in active Latin throughout the United States. Minkova is an elected fellow of the Rome-based Academia Latinitati Fovendae, the primary learned society devoted to the preservation and promotion of the use of Latin.

References

External links
 Milena Minkova Speaking Latin

Latinists
Bulgarian philologists
Women philologists
Bulgarian expatriates in the United States
University of Kentucky faculty
21st-century Latin-language writers
Year of birth missing (living people)
Living people